Chen Tian (1900–1986), also known as Chen Jingwen, was a Taiwanese geisha and supporter of social movements in the Taiwanese resistance to Japanese rule. She was Chiang Wei-shui's concubine.

Life
Around 1919, Chen was a geisha in a high-end restaurant in Taipei. While working there she met Chiang Wei-shui, one of the founders of the Taiwanese Cultural Association (1921) and, later, the Taiwanese People's Party (1927). Chen married Chiang as a concubine. Chiang taught Chen literacy and Chen began reading Chinese and Japanese books. Chen Tian joined the Taiwan Cultural Association's Taipei Youth Reading Club. She was the club's only female member. Thereafter, Chen helped Chiang with his activism and, when Chiang was imprisoned (in 1924 and 1925), she supported him through correspondence, sending him clothes, books and articles by other activists, and also replaced him in lectures, giving speeches to promote his ideas.

She resided there until her death in 1986.

Popular culture
Chen Tian features in the musical The Impossible Times, based on Chiang Wei-shui's life.

References

1900 births
1986 deaths
Geishas
Taiwanese activists
Taiwanese women activists
Taiwanese nuns